Gitua is an Austronesian language of Morobe Province, Papua New Guinea.

References

Ngero languages
Languages of Morobe Province